Noršinci is a place name that may refer to:

 Noršinci, Moravske Toplice, a village in Prekmurje, Slovenia
 Noršinci pri Ljutomeru, a village in the Slovene Styria, Slovenia